Ab Shureh-ye Ashniz-e Bala (also Romanized as Āb Shūreh-ye Āshnīz-e Bālā; also known as Āb Shūreh) is a village in Bafruiyeh Rural District, in the Central District of Meybod County, Yazd Province, Iran. At the 2006 census, its population was 36, in 10 families.

References 

Populated places in Meybod County